Grevillea tetragonoloba is an erect or spreading shrub which is endemic to Western Australia. The red or brown "toothbrush" flowers appear between early winter and late spring. The species occurs in an area between Albany and Esperance on sandy or loam soils. It grows to between 0.6 and 2.6 m high.

References

tetragonoloba
Endemic flora of Western Australia
Eudicots of Western Australia
Proteales of Australia
Taxa named by Carl Meissner